Masoud Ahmadzadeh Heravi (2 March 1945 – 4 December 1972) was an Iranian Marxist political theorist. Though often described as a Revolutionary Communist, his work mostly dealt with the grounds that Struggle is concerned with 'Strategy' and 'Tactics'. His work centered on the fact that defeat of Capitalism and Comprador Capitalism is possible by "Armed Struggle; both a Strategy and a Tactic". He left Mashhad in 1964 and he went to Tehran and studied Mathematics at the University of Tehran. His works deal with the nature of comprador Capitalism, and the subjects of politics, Guerrilla Warfare, monarchy, and dictatorship.

He was executed in chitgar shooting range for his military activities against regime and imperialism .

References

1946 births
1972 deaths
Iranian communists
Modernists
People executed by Pahlavi Iran
Political philosophers
University of Tehran alumni
Organization of Iranian People's Fedai Guerrillas members
National Front (Iran) student activists
Iranian people of Afghan descent
Executed communists